Mahesana–Abu Road DEMU is a DEMU train belonging to North Western Railway zone that runs between  in Gujarat and  of Rajasthan. It is currently being operated with 79437/7948 train numbers on daily basis.

Route and halts

The important halts of the train are:

Average speed and frequency

The train runs with an average speed of 37 km/h and completes 117 km in 3 hrs 10 min. There are seven trains which  runs on a daily basis.

See also 

 Mahesana Junction railway station
 Abu Road railway station

Notes

References

External links 

 79437/Mahesana–Abu Road DEMU
 79438/Abu Road–Mahesana DEMU

Rail transport in Gujarat
Rail transport in Rajasthan
Diesel–electric multiple units of India
Transport in Mehsana
Sirohi district